Grinev (Гринев, Гринёв) is a Russian surname. Notable people with the surname include:

Leonid Grinev (1882–?), Russian fencer
Roman Grinev (1976–2018), Russian musician
Vladislav Grinev (born 1996), Russian swimmer

Russian-language surnames